Occupation in 26 Pictures (also distributed internationally as Occupation in 26 Tableaux) is a 1978 Yugoslavian war film directed by Lordan Zafranović. It was entered into the 1979 Cannes Film Festival. The film was selected as the Yugoslav entry for the Best Foreign Language Film at the 51st Academy Awards, but was not accepted as a nominee.

Plot
It shows three friends just before World War II in Dubrovnik—Miho (a Jew), Niko (a Croat) and Toni (an Italian)—who, during the war, undergo different fates. Toni joins the Italian Blackshirts. Miho's family becomes a target of persecution. Niko's sister marries Toni in spite of her family's wishes. Niko after all joins the Partisans.

Cast
 Frano Lasić as Niko
 Milan Štrljić as Toni
 Tanja Poberžnik as Ane
 Boris Kralj as Baldo
 Ivan Klemenc as Miho
 Gordana Pavlov as Mara
 Stevo Žigon as Hubička
 Bert Sotlar as Stijepo
 Marija Kohn as Luce
 Karlo Bulić as Paško
 Zvonko Lepetić as Gavran
 Milan Erak as Maraš
 Antun Nalis as Paolo
 Tanja Bošković as Pina
 Izet Hajdarhodžić as Dum Đivo

Controversies
The film was controversial due to many things. In the communist Yugoslavia it was scandalous because of too many sexually explicit and violent scenes. Naturalistic portrayal of the widespread Ustasha atrocities made this film despised in the newly independent Croatia.

See also
 List of submissions to the 51st Academy Awards for Best Foreign Language Film
 List of Yugoslav submissions for the Academy Award for Best Foreign Language Film

References

External links

1978 films
1970s war films
Yugoslav war films
Croatian war films
Films directed by Lordan Zafranović
Films shot in Croatia
Films set in Croatia
Films set in Dubrovnik
Films set in Yugoslavia
Jadran Film films
War films set in Partisan Yugoslavia
Yugoslav World War II films
Croatian World War II films
1970s Croatian-language films